The 36th running of the Tour of Flanders cycling classic was held on Sunday, 6 April 1952. Belgian Roger Decock won the race in a three-man sprint before Loretto Petrucci and Briek Schotte. 43 of 210 riders finished.

Route
The race started in Ghent and finished in Wetteren – totaling 258 km. The course featured four categorized climbs:
 Kwaremont
 Kruisberg
 Edelareberg
 Muur van Geraardsbergen

Results

References

1952
Tour of Flanders
Tour of Flanders
Tour of Flanders
Tour of Flanders